Ioanna Filippou (born 1995) is a Cypriot beauty pageant title holder. She holds the title Miss World Kypros 2013. At the Star Kypros, she was crowned as the second title who was represented Cyprus at Miss World 2014

Star Cyprus 2013
Eventually, Elisa Georgiou won the title of Star Cyprus 2013 and she also won the title of Miss Fantastic in 2013. She is preparing to compete at Miss Universe 2014. The Runners-up were getting the title as Miss Cyprus, Miss Carlsberg and Miss Mediterranean and also will represent Cyprus at International Pageants. Ioanna Filippou was crowned as the second title of the pageant.

References

Cypriot beauty pageant winners
Living people
1995 births
Miss World 2014 delegates